Calliostoma hexalyssion is a species of sea snail, a marine gastropod mollusk in the family Calliostomatidae.

Description

Distribution
This marine species occurs off the Solomon Islands.

References

 Vilvens C. (2009). New species and new records of Calliostomatidae (Gastropoda: Trochoidea) from New Caledonia and Solomon Islands. Novapex 10(4): 125-163

External links

hexalyssion
Gastropods described in 2009